Zhongu (Zhonggu) Tibetan is a Tibetic language of Sichuan, China, once considered a dialect of Khams. It is spoken in Songpan County.

References

Bibliography 
T-S. Sun Jackson, 2003. "Phonological profile of Zhongu: a new Tibetan dialect of Northern Sichuan". Language and Linguistics, 4/4, 769–836.

Bodic languages
Languages of China